Lin Ying (or Lam Ying in Cantonese, born 1963) is a Chinese former badminton player and one of the most successful doubles specialists in the sport's modern history. During her 9-year career representing China's national badminton team, she won women's doubles at many world class tournaments and played on China's dominant Uber Cup teams of the 1980s. She has been nicknamed "The Chinese Queen of Doubles".

Career
Born in Xiamen, Fujian, Lin won the gold medal in women's doubles at the IBF World Championships three times, in the 1983 with Wu Dixi, and in the 1987 and 1989 IBF World Championships with Guan Weizhen. She, Guan Weizhen and three other later Chinese players, Gao Ling and Huang Sui, and Yu Yang are the only players who have won this title three times. She also won the World Badminton Grand Prix in women's doubles in 1987 and 1988 with Guan Weizhen, and the prestigious All England Championship in 1982 and 1984 with Wu Dixi, in addition to many other international titles. Lin was a member of the world champion Chinese Uber Cup teams of 1984, 1986, and 1988.

External links
All England champions 1899-2007

1963 births
Badminton players from Fujian
Living people
Asian Games medalists in badminton
People from Xiamen
Chinese female badminton players
Badminton players at the 1982 Asian Games
Badminton players at the 1986 Asian Games
Badminton players at the 1988 Summer Olympics
Asian Games gold medalists for China
Asian Games bronze medalists for China
Medalists at the 1982 Asian Games
Medalists at the 1986 Asian Games